René Gérard (12 November 1894 – 28 June 1976) was a French racing cyclist. He rode in the 1924 Tour de France.

References

1894 births
1976 deaths
French male cyclists
Place of birth missing